Leslie James Mitchell (15 April 1891 – 5 August 1957) was an Australian rules footballer who played with Melbourne in the Victorian Football League (VFL).

Notes

External links 

1891 births
Australian rules footballers from Victoria (Australia)
Melbourne Football Club players
1957 deaths